The San Sebastian Golden Stags (also known as SSC-R Stags) are the National Collegiate Athletic Association (Philippines) basketball team of the San Sebastian College – Recoletos.
Their 5 consecutive NCAA seniors basketball championships was the longest streak in the NCAA.

The other senior varsity teams may also be referred to as the Stags. The juniors team are the San Sebastian Staglets, while the women's team are the San Sebastian Lady Stags.

Monicker

The Recollect fathers chose a stag for it symbolizes a Christian who, filled with moral ideas, runs fast to God swiftly yet quietly in pursuit of his goals.

The use of the stag as SSC-R symbol started when SSC-R, originally an exclusive school for boys, joined the National Collegiate Athletic Association. In religion, the stag is a symbol of moral ideals. It was used by the early Christians as an emblem of Christ and as a figure of the apostles. It became the symbol of administration of baptism because of its capacity to carry heavy load or object. It was also used as the symbol of the catechumen who aspired for martyrdom.

Some of the Holy Fathers presented the Stags as model of what a Christian should do when a pagan threatens him. That is to run away fast to God. A fitting comparison because aside from swiftness coupled with quietness in the pursuit of goals, the stags is gifted with speed and nimbleness to evade dangers. Like a stag, a Christian should be quick to avoid the practice and agencies when they become moral threats.
In the same manner, without the hunter knowing it, the stag would lead the hunter out of the jungle into a cleared area. A Christian should do no less. Even as he evades the temptations of the consumeristic and materialistic establishments, he should guide the owners and consumers out of the jungle of sin to the cleared area of salvation.

Bravo
Literally, it means, “brave” a word taken from “bravura” which means “courage”. But courage does no mean being the “siga-siga” type who does not run away from a fight. It means evading or running away from dangers of his soul. A coward runs away with a trembling heart and a broken spirit. A courageous man runs away with a firm heart, a strong faith and triumphant soul, and we salute this type of man.

Colors
The colors Red and Gold were adopted as to identify San Sebastian College during the National College Athletic Association. Red symbolizes sacrifice, martyrdom, bravery and baptism. The element of Gold represented by its shimmering color, on the other hand, stands for endurance and the perennial quest for high standards – inner strength in the quest for excellence – symbolic of the loyal dignity of a true Christian.
Thus, the Sebastinian renders sacrifices and, in a way, martyrdom, for he submits himself to the pains of rigorous training and discipline in his quest for glory. This entails bravery not only in fighting for victory but in accepting defeat graciously as well; and endurance to be able to withstand pain.

Corporate support
In 2016, Foton Motor Philippines, the exclusive distributor of Foton motor vehicles in the Philippines signed an agreement to support the athletics program of the San Sebastian College and helping in the growth and success of the school athletes. The agreement signing was witnessed by Foton officials Rommel Sytin and Alvin Lu and San Sebastian officials Atty. Raymund Munsayac and Coach Roger Gorayeb.

Basketball

The San Sebastian Stags Basketball Team 

The Golden Stags have won 12 titles in the NCAA since 1973. Their last title was in 2009-10. The team featured the then-rookie Calvin Abueva who would become the most outstanding player in the school's history.

NCAA Season 98

Depth chart 
</noinclude>Depth chart

Juniors' Roster

Beach volleyball
 NCAA Season 93
Women's
 Alyssa S. Eroa
 Dangie V. Encarnacion
 Daureen Claire A. Santos

Men's
 Elino Elmer B. Lazaro
 Jahir S. Ebrahim
 James Christian B. Eugenio

Juniors
 Raxel Redd Catris
 Stephen John Sundiang
 Romeo Teodones, Jr.

Track and field
Joselito Gando(Coach)
Kim Cedrick Galang (The Fastest Man Alive, 2012-2013 NCAA MVP)
Arthuro Oliveros Jr.(Road Runner)
Daryl Ceballos
Justin Tabunda  (2006-2007 NCAA MVP)
George Kheanou Luis (Rookie of the Year)
Isidro Del Prado Jr.
Oliver Ocampo
Jose Florentino Bagallon
Andrezel Chuaquico
Emmanuel Manzanero Jr.
Antonio Asuncion Jr.(former 1998-1999 NCAA MVP)
Rayven Lozares  (former 1999-2000 NCAA MVP)
Anthony Cabling (former 1997-1998 NCAA MVP)
Michael Bautista
Rowie Sioson
Kayson Ki
Edward Brojan

Championship seasons '98,'99,'00,'06

Swimming
Jeng Reamillo (rookie of the year, mvp)
Daryl Pat Buensuceso (1984-85 Overall Swimming Champion - Junior Division Team Member, 3-time medallists)
Emman "Mr. Perfect" Morandarte (Fastest Swimmer Alive, Swimmer of the Year 2017, Athlete of the Year 2017, Time Magazine Most Influential Man of the Year 2017, NCAA Season 93 MVP, NCAA Season 93 Rookie of the Year, 17 time gold medalist)

San Sebastian cheerleading squad
The NCAA Cheerdance Competition is an annual one-day event of the National Collegiate Athletic Association for cheerleading. It was sponsored by Nestlé in 2004 and 2005 and was known as the NCAA Nestlé Non-Stop Cheerdance Competition. On 2007, the competition was sponsored by Samsung and was called as Samsung NCAA Cheerdance Competition. They won 2nd Runner-up in 2004 and 1st Runner-up in 2005.

All member schools field in their respective pep/cheering squads in a predetermined sequence. The sequence is determined by drawing of lots a week before the competition. Judges who are known for their prowess in cheerleading, dancing and gymnastics, plus a representative from Nestlé, determine the winning pep squad (when they sponsored the event).

It is the only coeducational sport in the NCAA. However, it is not counted in the tabulation to determine the General Champion

The official cheerleading squad of San Sebastian College - Recoletos de Manila is the  Golden Stags Cheerleading Squad (GSCS).

Volleyball

The Sebastian Lady Stags was the most number of championship in the NCAA with 23 championship titles.

Team roster

 NCAA Season 95 

 Head coach: Roger Gorayeb
 Asst. coach: Clint Malazo

See also
 San Beda-San Sebastian rivalry

References

National Collegiate Athletic Association (Philippines) teams
Former Philippine Basketball League teams
College sports teams in Metro Manila